The Graveyard is a computer art game developed by Belgian developer Tale of Tales in which the player assumes the role of an elderly woman walking through a graveyard to a bench.

The Graveyard was nominated for the Innovation Award at the 2009 Independent Games Festival. The game was one of the inspirations for the Tibetan village scene in Uncharted 2: Among Thieves.

References

2008 video games
Android (operating system) games
Art games
IOS games
MacOS games
Monochrome video games
Video games developed in Belgium
Video games featuring female protagonists
Video games set in cemeteries
Windows games
Video games about old age